Pyotr Starkovsky was a Russian actor. Honored Artist of the RSFSR.

Selected filmography 
 1937 — The Lonely White Sail
 1949 — Encounter at the Elbe
 1954 — Devotion
 1954 — Yevgeniya Grande

References

External links 
 Петр Старковский on kino-teatr.ru

Russian male film actors
20th-century Russian male actors
1884 births
1964 deaths